At least two ships of the Royal Norwegian Navy have been named HNoMS Stord, after the island of Stord:

, an S-class destroyer acquired from the Royal Navy in 1943 and broken up in 1959.
, a  launched in 1966 and transferred to Poland in 2002.

Royal Norwegian Navy ship names